Dr. Susan Calvin is a fictional character appearing in Isaac Asimov's Robot series of science fiction short stories. According to I, Robot, Susan Calvin was born in the year 1982 and died at the age of 82, either in 2064 or 2065.

She was the chief robopsychologist at US Robots and Mechanical Men, Inc., posited as the major manufacturer of robots in the 21st century. She was the main character in many of Asimov's short stories concerning robots, which were later collected in the books I, Robot and The Complete Robot.

Fictional character biography
According to Asimov's fictional history of robotics, Susan Calvin was born in 1982, the same year that US Robots and Mechanical Men was incorporated. At 16, she wrote the first of many papers on robotics, a Physics-1 paper entitled "Practical Aspects of Robotics". This was after attending a Psycho-Math seminar at which Dr Alfred Lanning of US Robots demonstrated the first mobile robot to be equipped with a voice. As quoted in I, Robot; "Susan said nothing at that seminar; took no part in the hectic discussion period that followed. She was a frosty girl, plain and colorless, who protected herself against a world she disliked by a mask-like expression and a hypertrophy of intellect. But as she watched and listened, she felt the stirrings of a cold enthusiasm".

Graduating with a bachelor's degree from Columbia University in 2003, she began post-graduate work in cybernetics, learning to construct positronic brains such that responses to given stimuli could be accurately predicted. She joined US Robots in 2008 as their first Robopsychologist, having earned her PhD. By 2029, when she left Earth for the first time to visit Hyper Base, her formal title was Head Psychologist.

In Asimov's stories, her emotionless brilliance is portrayed positively, when she solves issues with robots manufactured by her company.  Usually, she is tripped up when she is swayed by emotion (as in "Liar!" and "Lenny").

In the Mickey Zucker Reichert book I, Robot: To Protect, while working as a Psychiatrist in 2035, she was handed four cases; a traumatized girl that has not talked for 6 years, an obese boy that can't stop eating, a teenaged girl with "dementia, status post A-V fistula repair", and a 4-year-old girl accused of attempted murder.

Susan Calvin retired from US Robots in 2057 but continued to act as an occasional consultant for the company. She died in 2064, aged 82.

In "Evidence", when asked, "Are robots so different from men?", she replies, "Worlds different. Robots are essentially decent".  Asimov's own stories leave her misanthropy largely unexplained, but Harlan Ellison's screenplay adaptation of I, Robot investigates its origins, and in the end concludes that her attitudes are rather well-founded.

An excerpt from Harlan Ellison's screenplay adaptation of I, Robot has this to say about Dr. Calvin; "She is a small woman, but there is a towering strength in her face. Tensile strength, that speaks to endurance, to maintaining in the imperfect world. Her mouth is thin, and her face pale. Grace lives in her features, and intelligence; but she is not an attractive woman. She is not one of those women who in later years it can be said of them, "She must have been a beauty when she was younger". Susan Calvin was always plain. And clearly, always a powerful personality".

It was not until a mention of her in The Robots of Dawn, Asimov's third Elijah Baley Robot novel, that the events of her era (the 21st century) were concretely tied into those of Baley's era, three millennia further into the future, and thus into the greater Foundation universe as a whole.

Portrayals in other media
She was played by three separate actresses in British television, beginning in 1962 with Maxine Audley in an adaption of "Little Lost Robot" for the TV series Out of This World, then later played by Beatrix Lehmann in the 1967 "The Prophet", and followed by Wendy Gifford in 1969's "Liar!" both being episodes in the series Out of the Unknown. Ann Firbank portrayed the character, renamed Inge Jensen, in the Out of the Unknown adaptation of "Satisfaction Guaranteed". Margaret Robertson played her in the BBC Radio 4 adaptation of the same story.

In the 2004 film I, Robot, Calvin is played by Bridget Moynahan and serves as an operative who "makes the robots seem more human" and is completely dependent on the Three Laws of Robotics. She initially does not believe in Del Spooner's assertion that robots can be bad, despite running into the lawless NS-5 "Sonny". She eventually finds out that Sonny actually did kill Dr. Alfred Lanning.

A character named Dr. Susan Calvin (played by Marilyn Erskine) appears in the episode "Sun Gold" of the American anthology TV series "Science Fiction Theater."  Although the episode was not based on an Asimov story and has nothing to do with robots, it is likely that the character name was a tribute to Asimov and his works.

In the 2012 short film "HENRi", a character named Dr. Calvin is played by Margot Kidder, and while the film itself has no other connection to any Asimov stories, the name is most likely another tribute.

References by other writers
Arthur C. Clarke mentions Susan Calvin several times alongside Ada Lovelace and Grace Hopper: In his novel 3001: The Final Odyssey she appears as a female "role-model" in "the battle of wits between man and machine" (Chapter 36: Chamber of Horrors); in The Ghost from the Grand Banks Clarke refers to "the small pantheon of famous women programmers" while he puts one of the novel's characters in a league with the three aforementioned ladies (Chapter 4: The Century Syndrome).
It is unclear whether Clarke is referring to Calvin in the sense of Asimov's fictional character or as a character who existed in his fictional universe.

Susan Calvin also appears in David Wingrove's illustrated fiction "The Immortals of Science Fiction" (1980). Here she is interviewed, along with nine other famous science fiction characters.

In November 2009, the Isaac Asimov estate announced the upcoming publication of Robots and Chaos, the first volume in a trilogy featuring Susan Calvin by fantasy author Mickey Zucker Reichert. The book was published in November, 2011 under the title I, Robot: To Protect.

List of stories featuring Susan Calvin, in chronological order by publication

"Liar!" (1941) (first anthologized in I, Robot)
"Escape!" (1945) (first anthologized in I, Robot)
"Evidence" (1946) (first anthologized in I, Robot)
"Little Lost Robot" (1947) (first anthologized in I, Robot)
"The Evitable Conflict" (1950) (first anthologized in I, Robot)
"Robbie" (1950) (first anthologized in I, Robot) (Susan Calvin only appears briefly in this story. She did not appear in the original 1940 magazine publication. She was added to the story for the 1950 book)
"Satisfaction Guaranteed" (1951) (first anthologized in Earth Is Room Enough)
"Risk" (1955) (first anthologized in The Rest of the Robots)
"Galley Slave" (1957) (first anthologized in The Rest of the Robots)
"Lenny" (1958) (first anthologized in The Rest of the Robots)
"Feminine Intuition" (1969) (first anthologized The Bicentennial Man and Other Stories)
"Robot Dreams" (1986) (included in Robot Dreams)
"Balance" by Mike Resnick (1989) (included in Foundation's Friends)
"PAPPI" by Sheila Finch (1989) (included in Foundation's Friends)
"Plato's Cave" by Poul Anderson (1989) (included in Foundation's Friends)
"The Fourth Law of Robotics" by Harry Harrison (1989) (included in Foundation's Friends)
I, Robot: To Protect (2011) by Mickey Zucker Reichert
I, Robot: To Obey (2013) by Mickey Zucker Reichert
I, Robot: To Preserve (2016) by Mickey Zucker Reichert

References

Further reading 

In Memory Yet Green/In Joy Still Felt, by Isaac Asimov. Asimov's two volume Autobiography.
 The Complete Robot by Isaac Asimov. A collection of Robot stories with introductions.

External links
 Virtual Human (chatbot) version of Susan Calvin

Female characters in literature
Fictional female doctors
Fictional female scientists
Fictional people from the 21st-century
Fictional psychologists
Fictional roboticists
Foundation universe characters
Literary characters introduced in 1941